In machine learning, repeated incremental pruning to produce error reduction (RIPPER) is a propositional rule learner proposed by William W. Cohen as an optimized version of IREP.

References

Links
 Data Mining Algorithms In R/Classification/JRip

Machine learning algorithms